National Highway 181, commonly referred to as NH 181, is a highway connecting the city of Coimbatore in Tamil Nadu to Gundlupete in Karnataka state, South India. The city of Mysuru is connected to Ooty by road via Nanjanagudu, Gundlupete, Bandipur and Gudalur. The national highway 181 passes through Bandipur Tiger Reserve (National Park) and Mudumalai Tiger Reserve, hence vehicular traffic is restricted at night. Wild animals like elephants, bison, bears, tiger, and leopards can be spotted sometimes on this highway in the tiger reserve stretches. NH 181 after Ooty goes to Coonoor, Mettupalayam, Karamadai and ends in Coimbatore city.

See also
 National Highway 766 (India)
 National Highway 948 (India)

References

81
National highways in India